Sadulla Karjiker (born 6 January 1970) is a South African legal scholar and Professor & Anton Mostert Chair in Intellectual Property Law at Stellenbosch University.
He is known for his works on corporate law and intellectual property.

Views
In June 2020, in an article on Daily Maverick, Karjiker criticized the proponents of the Copyright Amendment Bill (South African copyright law) for resorting to "placing the blind and visually impaired at the centre of their attempts to pressure the president to sign the bill."
The article was replied by Blind SA.

References

South African legal scholars
Living people
1970 births
Solicitors
University of Cape Town alumni
Stellenbosch University alumni
Academic staff of Stellenbosch University
Alumni of Queen Mary University of London
Intellectual property law scholars